Suse Broyde is an American chemical biologist who is a professor at New York University. Her research considers the mechanisms that underpin DNA damage. Broyde is the author of the Wiley textbook The Chemical Biology of DNA Damage.

Early life and education 
Broyde moved to New York City in 1940. She was the only child of Jewish-German immigrants who had escaped Nazi Germany. She became interested in science as a child, and was accepted to Hunter College High School at the age of eleven. She was trained in liberal arts alongside science and technology. Broyde earned her bachelor's degree City College of New York, which she referred to as “The Harvard of the poor.” She moved to Brooklyn Polytechnic for her doctoral research, where she studied physical and biological chemistry. In particular, Broyde was interested in how chlorophylls absorb light. She spent a year at Princeton University, where she first learnt about molecular modelling.

Research and career 
Broyde returned to New York City, where she was awarded an National Institutes of Health grant to study carcinogens. In particular, Broyde investigates DNA damage caused by environmental chemicals. She has shown that cancer is initiated through its attack on DNA. Lesions in DNA can be repaired, but can also replicate, generating mutations that start a carcinogenic processes. She makes use of quantum chemical calculations and molecular dynamics to understand the processes that cause DNA lesions that can trigger cancerous pathways.

Broyde argued that the specific types of DNA damage will determine whether or not it can be repaired. In the case that the DNA is not repaired, the conformation of DNA within a polymerase will determine whether or not normal replication can occur. Broyde has studied the damage caused to DNA by sunlight, air pollution, tobacco smoke and barbecued foods.

Awards and honors 
 Elected to Sigma Xi
 Association for Women in Science Outstanding Woman Scientist
 Margaret and Herman Sokol Award in the Sciences
 American Chemical Society Toxicology Founder's Award

Selected publications

Personal life 
Broyde has two children, who are both professors, and seven grandchildren.

References 

Living people
Year of birth missing (living people)
20th-century American biologists
21st-century American biologists
New York University faculty
Hunter College High School alumni
City College of New York alumni